Manendragarh-Chirmiri-Bharatpur district is a district of Chhattisgarh state in India. Earlier it was in Korea district. Manendragarh has been inaugurated as a separate District on September 9, 2022 by the Chief Minister of Chhattisgarh State Shri Bhupesh Baghel. administrative headquarters of the district is Manendragarh.

The district lies in the northwesternmost part of Chhattisgarh in the Surguja division. It borders Madhya Pradesh to the north and west, Koriya and Surajpur districts to the east and Korba and Gaurela-Pendra-Marwahi districts to the south. It is mountainous and forested, and largely tribal-populated. The district was part of the princely states of Changbhakar and Korea before Independence.

The district has three subdivisions:- Bharatpur, Manendragarh and Khadganwan, and divided into six tehsils :- Manendragarh, Bharatpur, Khadgawan, Chirmiri, Kelhari And Kotadol.

Demographics 

At the time of the 2011 census, Manendragarh-Chirimri-Bharatpur district had a population of 411,490. Manendragarh-Chirimri-Bharatpur district has a sex ratio of 970 females to 1000 males. 32.27% of the population lives in urban areas. Scheduled Castes and Scheduled Tribes make up 34,339 (8.35%) and 207,156 (50.34%) of the population respectively.

At the time of the 2011 census, 38.58% of the population spoke Hindi, 34.09% Surgujia, 7.08% Bagheli, 5.60% Chhattisgarhi, 5.04% Baghoria, 1.77% Odia, 1.33% Bhojpuri, 1.19% Bengali and 1.06% Sadri as their first language.

References

Districts of Chhattisgarh